Alexis Gabriel Esparza (born June 20, 1993 in Cipolletti (Río Negro), Argentina) is an Argentine footballer who currently plays for Naval of the Segunda División Profesional in Chile.

Teams
  Cipolletti 2012–2015
  Independiente de Neuquén 2015
  Cartaginés 2016
  Naval 2016–present

External links
 
 
 

1993 births
Living people
Argentine footballers
Argentine expatriate footballers
Club Cipolletti footballers
C.S. Cartaginés players
Naval de Talcahuano footballers
Segunda División Profesional de Chile players
Expatriate footballers in Chile
Expatriate footballers in Costa Rica
Association football midfielders
People from Cipolletti